The Asia/Oceania Zone was one of the three zones of the regional Davis Cup competition in 1994.

In the Asia/Oceania Zone there were three different tiers, called groups, in which teams competed against each other to advance to the upper tier. Winners in Group III advanced to the Asia/Oceania Zone Group II in 1995. All other teams remained in Group III.

Participating nations

Draw
 Venue: Khalifa International Tennis and Squash Complex, Doha, Qatar
 Date: 6–10 April

Group A

Group B

  and  promoted to Group II in 1995.

Group A

Bahrain vs. Brunei

Jordan vs. Lebanon

Bahrain vs. Uzbekistan

Brunei vs. Jordan

Bahrain vs. Lebanon

Brunei vs. Uzbekistan

Bahrain vs. Jordan

Lebanon vs. Uzbekistan

Brunei vs. Lebanon

Jordan vs. Uzbekistan

Group B

Bangladesh vs. Qatar

Kuwait vs. Syria

Oman vs. United Arab Emirates

Bangladesh vs. Kuwait

Oman vs. Syria

Qatar vs. United Arab Emirates

Bangladesh vs. United Arab Emirates

Kuwait vs. Oman

Qatar vs. Syria

Bangladesh vs. Oman

Kuwait vs. Qatar

Syria vs. United Arab Emirates

Bangladesh vs. Syria

Kuwait vs. United Arab Emirates

Oman vs. Qatar

References

External links
Davis Cup official website

Davis Cup Asia/Oceania Zone
Asia Oceania Zone Group III